Oilskin is a waterproof cloth used for making garments typically worn by sailors and by others in wet areas. The modern oilskin garment was developed by a New Zealander, Edward Le Roy, in 1898.  Le Roy used worn-out sailcloth painted with a mixture of linseed oil and wax to produce a waterproof garment suitable to be worn on deck in foul-weather conditions. Oilskins are part of the range of protective clothing also known as foul weather gear.

History
Waterproofed cloth garments were in use from the late 1700s. Various methods of waterproofing were used over the years. Some early sou'westers and rain capes were handmade of sailcloth waterproofed with a thin layer of tar, while other methods involved  canvas duck coated with multiple applications of linseed oil and paint.  While durable, these methods of waterproofing did not possess the breathable qualities of Le Roy's process.

Modern oilskins may be made of flexible PVC-coated synthetic fabric, while advanced materials for extreme conditions such as yacht racing may be used.  Also known as "foul weather gear", contemporary oilskins include such innovations as DWR-coated nylon on their low end and Gore-Tex and other proprietary waterproof membranes on the high.

A Sou'wester, a traditional form of collapsible oilskin rain-hat, is longer in the back than the front to fully protect the neck.  Sou'westers sometimes feature a gutter front-brim.

Design 

Today's oilskins (or oilies) typically come in two parts, jackets and trousers.

Oilskin jackets are generally similar to common rubberized waterproofs. The chief difference is a high spray collar. Some have hoods, often in a high-visibility colour to increase visibility if a wearer falls overboard. Retroreflective patches are also strategically placed, and jacket tails are extra long to keep water off the legs and out of the joint where waterproof trousers meet.

Oilskin trousers – also known also as "bibs" – are very high-cut to provide a large overlap with the jacket. They are held up by braces, and typically feature straps around the bottom of the legs to cinch around seaboots.  This semi-watertight seal does not allow them to be used like fishing waders, but a wave sweeping briefly across the deck will generally be kept out. All but the cheapest brands are reinforced across the seat and knees.

In moderate weather often only the trousers are worn. Although a few all-in-one, boilersuit-shaped oilskin suits are available, most sailors prefer the flexibility of a separate jacket and trousers.

The cuffs of better oilskin jackets include an inner seal at the wrist similar to that on a scuba diver's drysuit to prevent water from being forced up the sleeve. Pockets on trousers and jackets are often lined with quick-drying synthetic fleece that is warm even when soaked. A recent innovation is removable soft linings, which enables them to be washed.

Some oilskin jackets include a built-in harness, typically a strap around the chest to clip into a lifeline. While convenient, this is not nearly as safe as a separate multi-point harness, often provided with an integrated lifejacket.  Some models of high-end oilskin jackets contain flotation and may also function as lifejackets; survival equipment such as lights, flares, and emergency position-indicating radiobeacon station (EPIRB) are also available as integrated accessories.

See also

References

External links

Classification of Foul Weather Gear

Coats (clothing)
Sailing equipment
Woven fabrics
Maritime culture